Al-Fayhaa Stadium is a multi-use stadium in Damascus, Syria, currently used mostly for football matches and serves as the home venue of the Syria national football team football team. The stadium was able to hold up to 15,000 spectators. However, in April 2020, it was converted into an all-seater stadium with a capacity of 12,000 seats.

History
In 1976, the stadium was opened as part of the al-Fayhaa Sports Complex, to host the 5th Pan Arab Games of 1976. In addition to the football stadium, the complex is also home to the al-Fayhaa Sports Arena, an outdoor Olympic swimming pool, indoor swimming pool, six outdoor tennis courts, two regular-sized football training pitches, two mini-football fields and an athletes' hotel. The headquarters of the Syrian Football Association is also located in the complex.

References

Football venues in Syria
Buildings and structures in Damascus